Chris Swain is a retired English-born American soccer goalkeeper.

In 1974 and 1975, Swain played for the Cleveland Cobras in the American Soccer League.  In 1976, he moved to the Chicago Cats.

References

American soccer players
American Soccer League (1933–1983) players
Association football goalkeepers
Chicago Cats players
Cleveland Cobras players
Living people
Year of birth missing (living people)